The Bulkemsmolen (English: Bulkem's Mill) is a former watermill located on the Bulkemstraat 43 in Bulkemsbroek, Simpelveld, Netherlands. Build in 1753 along the Eyserbeek river, the watermill functioned as gristmill until 1978. Currently it functions as housing for a local farm.

The mill is a national monument (nr 33588) since 1967. Of the original mill only the millhouse, wooden overshot water wheel, of 3.9m diameter and 1.2m width, and the mill race remain.

Gallery of images

See also 
 Oude Molen, Simpelveld

Watermills in the Netherlands
Watermills in Limburg (Netherlands)
Rijksmonuments in Simpelveld